In Greek mythology and later art, the name Hesione (/hɪˈsaɪ.əniː/; Ancient Greek: Ἡσιόνη) refers to various mythological figures, of whom the Trojan princess Hesione is most known.

Mythology

According to the Bibliotheca, the most prominent Hesione was a Trojan princess, daughter of King Laomedon of Troy, sister of Priam and second wife of King Telamon of Salamis. The first notable myth Hesione is cited in is that of Hercules, who saves her from a sea monster. However, her role becomes significant many years later when she is described as a potential trigger of the Trojan War.

Apollo and Poseidon were angry at King Laomedon because he refused to pay the wage he promised them for building Troy's walls. Apollo sent a plague and Poseidon a sea monster to destroy Troy. Oracles promised deliverance if Laomedon would expose his daughter Hesione to be devoured by the sea monster Cetus (in other versions, the lot happened to fall on her) and he exposed her by fastening her naked to the rocks near the sea. Heracles, Telamon, and Oicles happened to arrive on their return from the expedition against the Amazons. Seeing her exposed, Heracles promised to save her on condition that Laomedon would give him the wonderful horses he had received from Zeus as compensation for Zeus' kidnapping of Ganymede. Laomedon agreed, and Heracles slew the monster. In some accounts, after being swallowed by it, he hacked at its innards for three days before it died. He emerged, having lost all his hair. However, Laomedon refused to give him the promised award.

In a later expedition, Heracles attacked Troy, slew Laomedon and all of Laomedon's sons except the youngest, Podarces. Heracles gave Laomedon's daughter Hesione as a prize to Telamon instead of keeping her for himself. He allowed her to take with her any captives that she wished; she chose her brother Podarces. Heracles allowed her to ransom him in exchange for her veil. Therefore, Podarces henceforth became known as Priam, from ancient Greek πρίασθαι priasthai, meaning "to buy". Heracles then bestowed the government of Troy on Priam. However, it is also claimed that Priam simply happened to be absent campaigning in Phrygia during Heracles' attack on Troy.

Hesione was taken home by Telamon, married him, and bore him a son, Teucros, half-brother to Telamon's son from his first marriage, Ajax. Alternatively, she became pregnant with Trambelus while still on board the ship and then escaped; it is also possible, though, that the mother of Trambelus was not Hesione, but a certain Theaneira.

Many years later, when Hesione was an old woman, Priam sent Antenor and Anchises to Greece to demand Hesione's return, but they were rejected and driven away. Priam then sent Paris and Aeneas to retrieve her, but Paris got sidetracked and instead brought back Helen, queen of Sparta and wife of Menelaus. Priam was ultimately willing to accept the abduction of Helen, due to the Greeks' refusal to return Hesione.

Spurious references
The name Hesione in Dictys Cretensis 4.22 appears to be an error for Plesione of Dictys 1.9 and that in turn an error for Pleione.

References

Bibliography 

 Schwab, G. (2001). Gods and Heroes of Ancient Greece. New York: Pantheon Books.
Princesses in Greek mythology
Queens in Greek mythology
Trojans
Mythology of Heracles
Human sacrifice